Prasana Kumar (abbreviated P K) Roy Memorial College, Dhanbad is a constituent college of Binod Bihari Mahto Koyalanchal University in Dhanbad, in the Indian state of Jharkhand. It offers courses of Intermediate, Under-Graduate and Post Graduate level in various subjects.

History
The college was founded by Sh. B. N. Roy of The Roy Villa, Katrasgarh together with his brothers in the name of their father, Late Sh. Prasanna Kumar Roy (popularly known by the name, P. K. Roy). It was founded to realise P. K. Roy's philanthropic aim of building a modern India through higher education and entrepreneurship. The Roy family of Katrasgarh (now living in Dhanbad) donated vast areas of their personal land and spent huge sums of money in design and construction of the state-of-the-art college of that time which welcomed its very first batch of students in 1960.

The Roy family also participated very actively in ensuring effective administration of the college. The subsequent generation took the onus of further developing the college with all sincerity and dedication to propel the institution to the dizzy heights of glory. It was under Sh. Bijoli Kanti Roy's patronage that P. K. Roy Memorial College touched new heights and gained new dimensions. The Roy family and its subsequent generations have played an important role in shaping the future of Jharkhand's youth and of the city of Dhanbad by establishing this abode of learning.

In 1977 it got the status of a constituent college under Ranchi University, Ranchi.

Courses Offered
College offers following courses

 Intermediate in Science (I.Sc.) 
 Intermediate in Arts (I.A) 
 Intermediate in Commerce (I.Com) 
 Bachelors in Physics (B.Sc.) 
 Bachelors in Chemistry (B.Sc.) 
 Bachelors in Mathematics (B.Sc.) 
 Bachelors in Botany (B.Sc.) 
 Bachelors in Zoology (B.Sc.) 
 Bachelors in Geology (B.Sc.) 
 Bachelors in History (B.A.) 
 Bachelors in Economics (B.A.) 
 Post Graduate Courses in Arts, Science and Commerce (M.Sc. / M.Com. / M.A.) 
 Vocational Courses - Bachelor in Biotechnology (B.Sc.), Bachelor in Environment Science (B.Sc.).

Location 
P. K. Roy Memorial College, Dhanbad is located at Main Road NH 18, Saraidhela, Dhanbad.

Faculty
Mathematics department -Md. Nasim Ansari

Alumni
Binod Bihari Mahato (Founder Jharkhand Mukti Morcha), Dr. R. N. Bhattacharya (Neuro Surgeon, AMRI Kolkata), Prof. (Dr.) S.N. Singh (Vice Chancellor, NPU, Medininagar), Reena Jamil are some of the notable alumni who have made significant contribution on global arena.

References

External links

BBMKU's Official Website

Colleges affiliated to Binod Bihari Mahto Koyalanchal University
Universities and colleges in Jharkhand
Education in Dhanbad